The Halepaghen Grammar School, or HPS, is a gymnasium ("grammar school") in Buxtehude (Lower Saxony, Germany).

The school was mentioned for the first time in 1390 as an (original) grammar school. The school was named after Gerhard Halepaghe (born about 1430 in Buxtehude; died April 1484 in Buxtehude), a famous graduate from Buxtehude.

The Halepaghen School was the first school in Germany to establish a new sixth form system. Instead of a class system (Obersekunda, Unterprima, Oberprima), the HPS established a course system.

Notable alumni
Elton, comedian
Stefan Studer, former footballer
Tiemo Wölken, German Member of the European Parliament (MEP, Social Democratic Party of Germany)

See also
List of the oldest schools in the world

Pictures

External links
 School website 

Stade (district)
Schools in Lower Saxony
Educational institutions established in the 14th century
Buxtehude
Buxtehude